Robert del Picchia (born 10 November 1942 in Marseille) is a member of the Senate of France. He is a member of the Union for a Popular Movement Party.

References
Page on the Senate website

1942 births
Living people
Politicians from Marseille
French people of Italian descent
Rally for the Republic politicians
Union for a Popular Movement politicians
Gaullism, a way forward for France
The Republicans (France) politicians
Agir (France) politicians
French Senators of the Fifth Republic
Senators of French citizens living abroad